In economics, hysteresis (from Greek  hysterēsis, from  hystereō, "(I) lag behind, come later than") consists of effects that persist after the initial causes giving rise to the effects are removed. Two of the main areas in economics where hysteresis effects are invoked to explain economic phenomena are unemployment and international trade.

For instance, in labor economics hysteresis refers to the possibility that periods of high unemployment tend to increase the rate of unemployment below which inflation begins to accelerate, commonly referred to as the natural rate of unemployment or non-accelerating inflation rate of unemployment (NAIRU).

Implication for statistical characterization of unemployment

If the unemployment rate exhibits hysteresis, then it follows a statistically non-stationary process, because the expected value of the unemployment rate now and in the future permanently shifts when the rate itself changes.  The process with hysteresis is a unit root process, which in its simplest form can be characterized as

In contrast, a non-hysteresis model of unemployment would have  following a stationary process, so that  for arbitrarily large  would always equal a permanently fixed natural rate of unemployment.

Causes

When some negative shock reduces employment in a company or industry, there are fewer employed workers left. As the employed workers usually have the power to influence or set wages, their reduced number incentivizes them to bargain for even higher wages when the economy again gets better, instead of letting the wage stay at the equilibrium wage level, where the supply and demand of workers would match. This causes hysteresis, i.e., the unemployment becomes permanently higher after negative shocks.

It has also been argued that unemployed people lose their skills during unemployment, which makes them less likely to again get jobs.

Policy implications

If there is no hysteresis in unemployment, then for example if the central bank wishes to lower the inflation rate it may shift to a contractionary monetary policy, which if not fully anticipated and believed will temporarily increase the unemployment rate; if the contractionary policy persists, the unemployment rise will eventually disappear as the unemployment rate returns to the natural rate. Then the cost of the anti-inflation policy will have been temporary unemployment.  But if there is hysteresis, the unemployment rise initiated by the contractionary policy will never completely go away, and in this case the cost of the anti-inflation policy will have been permanently higher unemployment, making the policy less likely to have greater benefits than costs.

Evidence

The experience of the United Kingdom since the early 1980s counts against hysteresis as a determinant of the natural rate of unemployment, as unemployment fell much faster in the recovery from the early 1990s recession than after the early 1980s recession.

An econometric study of fourteen OECD countries rejected the hysteresis hypothesis, as did a study at the state level in the US.

See also
Insider-outsider theory of employment

References

Unemployment
New Keynesian economics